The 2009 East Asian Games torch relay was the torch relay portion prior to the opening of the East Asian Games.  It took place on 29 August 2009 on the 100th day countdown to the games.  About 500 local schools held torch relay activities from September 2009 to November 2009 prior to the start of the games in December.  The torch pipe was designed by HK designer Kan Tai-keung (靳埭強).  The relay held the theme "Light the way to the EAG".

Torch
The torch is a curvy cylinder with a square top and round bottom. It resembles the horn of an ox as 2009 is the year of the Ox. They create the patterns of "Lucky Clouds" to put forward the concept of yin and yang. This also convey the message that Hong Kong is a place where the Chinese and Western cultures meet.

Torch relay route
The relay point begins at Kowloon Park that travels to Austin Road and Nathan Road.  Then it turns to Salisbury Road and Tsim Sha Tsui East before reaching the Avenue of Stars and Kowloon Public Pier.  The bearers then cross Victoria Harbour by water and reach Expo drive east on the other side of the harbour.  It continues to Harbour Road before going to Expo drive and finish at the Golden Bauhinia Square with the last torch bearer.

Torchbearers
There were a total of 65 torchbearers.  The route was divided by 3 sections.

Section 1

Section 2

Section 3

See also

2009 East Asian Games opening ceremony
2008 Summer Olympics torch relay
2008 Summer Olympics torch relay route
2008 Summer Paralympics torch relay

References

Torch Relay, 2009 East Asian Games
Torch relays